Francis Edgar Williams (9 February 1893 – 12 May 1943) was an Australian anthropologist who worked for the government of the Territory of Papua from 1922 to 1942.

Life
Born in Malvern, South Australia and educated at Kyre College, the Baptist South Australia school, Williams graduated from the University of Adelaide in 1914 with high honours, and was accordingly awarded a Rhodes Scholarship to study at the University of Oxford. He nevertheless decided to join the Australian Imperial Force in 1915 and served in France as a lieutenant in the 32nd Battalion. Promoted to the honorary rank of captain in early 1918, he served in a secret mission in Caucasus under General Lionel Dunsterville. In 1919, he took up his Rhodes Scholarship at Balliol, and graduated in anthropology in 1921. Back in Australia at the end of the year, he met in February 1922 the Lieutenant-Governor of Papua, Hubert Murray, who was looking for a young and strong Oxford graduate to serve as an assistant government anthropologist next to Dr William Mersh Strong, more a practitioner than a scientist.

Appointed on 8 March 1922, Williams was promoted to Government Anthropologist when Strong retired in 1928, and kept the position until the demise of the Papuan administration in 1942. One of the few anthropologists of his time able to spend two continuous decades in the same location without having to regularly return to a metropolitan university or institution, he performed during those twenty years heavy field work, and published many books and articles, both monographic and general. In 1935, his manifesto The Blending of Culture hit a worldwide audience. Often agreeing with Murray, William was given complete liberty by the omnipotent administrator.

When World War II expanded to the Southern Pacific in December 1941, Williams came back to Australia and enlisted as a lieutenant to serve with military intelligence. He was promoted captain in November 1942. Among his many works, he wrote You and Native, a booklet advising the Allied soldiers on how to behave with Papuans. In early 1943, Williams was sent back to Papua to serve as a liaison officer with the Australian New Guinea Administrative Unit. On 12 May, he died in a plane crash on the Owen Stanley Range, 20 km south of Kokoda.

References
 Michael W. Young and Julia Clark, An Anthropologist in Papua. The Photography of F.E. Williams, 1922-39, Adelaide: Crawford House Publishing, 2002.

1893 births
1943 deaths
People from Adelaide
University of Adelaide alumni
Alumni of Balliol College, Oxford
Australian Rhodes Scholars
Victims of aviation accidents or incidents in Papua New Guinea
Australian military personnel of World War I
Australian Army personnel of World War II
Australian Army officers
Australian military personnel killed in World War II